Félix Amandus, Count de Muelenaere (5 April 1793 – 5 August 1862) was a Belgian Roman Catholic politician who served as the prime minister of Belgium from 1831 to 1832

Born in Pittem, he was a lawyer in Bruges and was from 1824 until 1829 member of the Second Chamber of the United Kingdom of the Netherlands for the province of West Flanders. After the independence of Belgium, he became provincial governor in West Flanders (1830–1831), member of the Belgian Chamber of Representatives for the arrondissement of Bruges (1831–1848), and Minister of Foreign Affairs in the first Belgian government.

After the inauguration of Leopold I as king in 1831, he became the third Prime Minister until 1832. Afterwards, he became again provincial governor for West-Flanders (1832–1834, 1836–1849) and Minister of Foreign Affairs (1834–1836, 1841). From 1850 until his death in 1862 in his birthplace Pittem, he was member of the Chamber for the arrondissement of Tielt.

Honours 
 National
 : 
 Iron Cross.
 Minister of State, by royal decree
 1856: Grand Cordon in the Order of Leopold
 Foreign
 : Grand Officier in the Legion of Honour
 : Knight Grand Cross in the Order of Charles III
 : Knight Grand Cross in the Order of the Dannebrog
 : Knight Grand cross of the Order of the Immaculate Conception of Vila Viçosa
 : Knight in the Order of the Netherlands Lion
 : Knight Grand Cross in the Saxe-Ernestine House Order

References

External links 
 Felix de Muelenaere in ODIS - Online Database for Intermediary Structures 

1793 births
1862 deaths
Prime Ministers of Belgium
Knights Grand Cross of the Order of the Immaculate Conception of Vila Viçosa
Grand Crosses of the Order of the Dannebrog
Recipients of the Order of the Netherlands Lion
Grand Croix of the Légion d'honneur
Belgian Ministers of State
Governors of West Flanders
Catholic Party (Belgium) politicians
Counts of Belgium
People from West Flanders